Communities in Nova Scotia are ordered by the highway upon which they are located.  All routes start with the terminus located near the largest community.

Trunk Routes

Trunk 1: Yarmouth - Lake Milo - Dayton - Hebron - Wellington - Darling's Lake - Port Maitland 
Trunk 3:  Yarmouth - Yarmouth 33 - Arcadia - Pleasant Lake - Tusket - Ste. Anne du Ruisseau - Lower Eel Brook - Glenwood - Argyle - Central Argyle - Lower Argyle - Pubnico - East Pubnico - Middle East Pubnico - Centre East Pubnico - Lower East Pubnico

Collector Roads

Route 203: Carleton - Kemptville - East Kemptville
Route 304: Yarmouth - Milton Highlands - Overton - Yarmouth Bar - John's Cove - Cape Forchu  
Route 308: Morris Island - Surette's Island - Sluice Point - Amiraults Hill - Hubbard's Point - Tusket - Belleville - North Belleville - Bell Neck - Springhaven - Quinan - East Quinan 
Route 334: Arcadia - Plymouth - Upper Wedgeport - Wedgeport - Lower Wedgeport 
Route 335: Pubnico - West Pubnico - Middle West Pubnico - Lower West Pubnico
Route 340: Yarmouth - Dayton - Hebron - South Ohio - Deerfield - Pleasant Valley - Carleton - Forest Glen

Communities located on rural roads

Abbots Dyke
Alder Plains
Argyle Sound
Argyle Station
Black Georges Savannah
Brazil Lake
Brenton
Brooklyn
Canaan
Chebogue
Chebogue Point
Chegoggin
Comeau's Hill
Gavelton
Gardner's Mill
Greenville
Ireton
Kelley's Cove
Lake Annis
Lake George
Little River Harbour
Lower West Pubnico
Melbourne
Middle West Pubnico
North Kemptville
Norwood
Overton
Pembroke
Pinkney's Point
Raynardton
Robert's Island
Rockville
Sand Beach
Sandford
Seal Island
Short Beach
South Belleville
South Canaan
Springhaven
Summerville
Tusket Falls
Tusket Islands
Upper West Pubnico
West Pubnico
Woodstock

External links
 Communities of Yarmouth County, Nova Scotia

Yarmouth County, Nova Scotia